Piti (Pitti, Bishi, Bisi) is a minor Kainji language of Kaduna State, Nigeria. Bishi speakers live in at least 26 villages.

Ngmgbang (Riban, Rigmgbang) was formerly listed as a dialect of Bishi, but is clearly a distinct although related language. It is spoken in a few villages in Kaduna State.

References

East Kainji languages
Languages of Nigeria